Gushan may refer to:

Gushan Environmental Energy (古杉集团), mainland Chinese biodiesel producer
Gushan, Khash (گوشان), a village in Iran

Places in Greater China
Gushan District (鼓山區), Kaohsiung, Taiwan
Mount Gu (Jingjiang) (孤山), or "Lonely Hill", a hill in Jingjiang, Jiangsu

Towns 
Gushan, Fuzhou (鼓山镇), in Jin'an District, Fuzhou, Fujian
Gushan, Jiangyin (顾山镇), in Jiangyin City, Jiangsu

Written as "崮山镇":
Gushan, Weihai, a village in Huancui District, Weihai, Shandong
Gushan, Zibo, a village in Boshan District, Zibo, Shandong

Written as "孤山镇":
Gushan, in Donggang City, Liaoning
Gushan, Jingjiang, in Jingjiang City, Jiangsu
Gushan Manchu Town (孤山满族镇), in Haicheng City, Liaoning

See also
Gushan station (disambiguation)